In mathematics, Lagrange's theorem usually refers to any of the following theorems, attributed to Joseph Louis Lagrange:

 Lagrange's theorem (group theory)
 Lagrange's theorem (number theory)
 Lagrange's four-square theorem, which states that every positive integer can be expressed as the sum of four squares of integers
 Mean value theorem in calculus
 The Lagrange inversion theorem
 The Lagrange reversion theorem
 The method of Lagrangian multipliers for mathematical optimization